Benchmark Mineral Intelligence also known as Benchmark Minerals, founded by Simon Moores in 2014, is a London-based IOSCO-regulated Price Reporting Agency (PRA) and specialist information provider for the lithium ion battery to electric vehicle (EV) supply chain.

Overview 
Benchmark Minerals’ price assessment division regularly price raw material on lithium, cobalt, graphite and nickel. In August 2019, the company was awarded the highest International Organization of Securities Commissions (IOSCO) assurance, known as Type 1 Reasonable assurance by Ernst & Young (EY) for its lithium prices. 

In 2021, Benchmark was awarded the IOSCO accreditation by PwC for all of its key battery raw materials of lithium, cobalt, nickel and graphite - the first time ever such an accreditation was awarded individually for each.  

Its Lithium ion Battery Megafactories Assessment tracks the global build out of cell capacity worldwide including cathode, anode, raw material demand, cell format and end users.

Benchmark Minerals holds events where its own expert analysts present their latest data, analysis and views on the market. The Benchmark World Tour is the series of free-investment seminars for the industry. Originally starting with 8 cities back in 2015, the Benchmark World Tour has grown to 15 cities world-wide including New York, Toronto, Sydney, Melbourne, Hong Kong, Tokyo, Seoul, London, Frankfurt, and Cape Town.

Benchmark Minerals’ premier industry event is known as Benchmark Minerals Week that takes place in California each year, it features two main shows, Cathodes Conference and Graphite & Anodes Conference.

Benchmark Minerals Summit takes place in Washington DC each year in May. The conference brings together both US-based lithium ion battery to electric vehicle supply chain and US government departments and policy makers.

Benchmark Mineral Intelligence has testified to the US Senate Committee for Energy & Natural Resources on three occasions, in 2017, 2019, and 2020

References 

Lithium-ion batteries
Energy companies of the United Kingdom